Mohamed Soltby (né Hazuev; born 11 September 1991) is a German professional boxer who held the IBF Baltic heavyweight title in 2019.

Professional boxing record

References

Living people
1991 births
Sportspeople from Grozny
Russian male boxers
German male boxers
Heavyweight boxers